Dendrobium densiflorum is a species of epiphytic or lithophytic orchid, native to Asia. It has club-shaped stems, three or four leathery leaves and densely flowered, hanging bunches of relatively large pale yellow and golden yellow flowers.

Description
The edges of the labellum surround the column.

Taxonomy and naming
Dendrobium densiflorum was first formally described in 1830 by John Lindley and the description was published in Nathaniel Wallich's book, Plantae Asiaticae rariores.

Distribution and habitat
It is found in China, Bhutan, northeastern India, Myanmar, Nepal and Thailand.

Dendrobium guibertii and D. amabile are similar species and sometimes confused with D. densiflorum, leading to uncertainty as to the distribution of this species.

Uses
Chemical compounds useful in medicine, including phenanthrenes have been extracted from this orchid.

References

External links

densiflorum
Flora of Indo-China
Flora of the Indian subcontinent
Orchids of China
Plants described in 1830
Taxa named by John Lindley